Shang is a village in the Leh district of Ladakh, India. It is located in the Kharu tehsil.

Demographics
According to the 2011 census of India, Shang has 51 households. The effective literacy rate (i.e. the literacy rate of population excluding children aged 6 and below) is 59.51%.

References

Villages in Kharu tehsil